7th Heaven is an American television drama series created by executive producer Brenda Hampton, and co-executive produced by Aaron Spelling and E. Duke Vincent through Spelling Television. The series revolves around a family headed by parents Eric Camden (Stephen Collins), a Protestant Reverend, and Annie Camden (Catherine Hicks), a homemaker. Their seven children are Matt (Barry Watson), Mary (Jessica Biel), Lucy (Beverley Mitchell), Simon (David Gallagher), Ruthie (Mackenzie Rosman) and twins Sam and David (Nikolas and Lorenzo Brino).

7th Heaven debuted on August 26, 1996, on The WB, a network which had launched only a year earlier. In November 2005, Variety Magazine announced The WB's decision to cancel the series at the end of the tenth season due to rising production costs. The final episode was intended to air on May 8, 2006, in the final year of The WB's operation before it merged with UPN to form The CW in the fall; however, the episode achieved 7 million viewers, and The CW revived the show, bringing it back to the schedules for its eleventh season on September 25, 2006. The return did not last long; due to flagging viewing figures, The CW made a schedule change midway through the eleventh season, switching 7th Heaven from the Monday 8:00 p.m. timeslot it had occupied since the first episode with Everybody Hates Chris in the Sunday 8:00 p.m. timeslot, and on April 2, 2007, The CW announced its decision to end the series, airing the final episode on May 13, 2007. In all, 243 episodes were produced over eleven seasons.

Series overview

Episodes

Season 1 (1996–97)

Season 2 (1997–98)

Season 3 (1998–99)

Season 4 (1999–2000)

Season 5 (2000–01)

Season 6 (2001–02)

Season 7 (2002–03)

Season 8 (2003–04)

Season 9 (2004–05)

Season 10 (2005–06)

Season 11 (2006–07)

References

General

Specific

External links

Lists of American teen drama television series episodes